Eric Magee (born 24 August 1947) is a Northern Irish former footballer who played as a forward for Glenavon, Oldham Athletic, Port Vale, and Linfield. He helped Port Vale to win promotion out of the Fourth Division in 1969–70.

Career
Magee played for Glenavon, before moving to England to play for Jimmy McIlroy's Oldham Athletic, in June 1967, reportedly for a fee of £5,000. The "Latics" finished 16th in the Third Division in 1967–68, before suffering relegation into the Fourth Division under the stewardship of Jack Rowley with a last place finish in 1968–69. Magee scored nine goals in 45 league games in his two seasons at Boundary Park. In July 1969 he signed for Gordon Lee's Port Vale; the club had an unusually small squad in the 1969–70 promotion season, but Magee only had 13 starts in all competitions, instead being favoured as a substitute. With just one FA Cup and one league goal from his 21 games (against Northampton Town at Vale Park and Tranmere Rovers at Prenton Park) he was given a free transfer in May 1970 and moved back to his native Northern Ireland to play for Linfield. He scored in the First Round of the European Cup in 1971–72, in a 3–2 defeat to Belgian side Standard Liège at Windsor Park.

Career statistics
Source:

Honours
Port Vale
Football League Fourth Division fourth-place promotion: 1969–70

References

People from Lurgan
Association footballers from Northern Ireland
Association football forwards
Glenavon F.C. players
Oldham Athletic A.F.C. players
Port Vale F.C. players
Linfield F.C. players
English Football League players
1947 births
Living people